

Epidemiology 

S. lupi is endemic (occurs naturally) from southern Africa all the way up to Israel, Turkey, Greece and India; faecal evidence also exists for it in the southern USA. Although early reports of the disease were American1-3, few reports emerge any longer from this country. This may be because a commonly-used insecticide wiped out a lot of the hosts, before being banned – so never reached Israel or SA (anecdotal). This parasite has a complex 110-day life cycle with both intermediate and paratenic (=transport) hosts.  Coprophagous (“dung”) beetles are the intermediate hosts, ingesting the eggs which contain the L1 larvae.  Within this host, the eggs encysts and develop into the infectious L3 larvae in 2 months.  The infectious process can be direct (ingestion of an infected beetle) or indirect (ingestion by a paratenic host[1] such as wild birds and poultry, lizards and rodents, rabbits and even hedgehogs). Thus both lizards and bird offal may be important sources of infection, although there is no proof, as some maintain, that hadidah ibis faeces are infectious.  The paratenic hosts are more probable sources of infection for domestic dogs.

Host characteristics 
There is no particular predilection by age or gender.  In one study4, older, sterilised female dogs were overrepresented amongst patients with malignant transformation of oesophageal nodules to sarcomas.  In another, Labradors and other large-breed dogs were overrepresented.5  Although due to the length of the lifecycle, infection is rare in patients under 6 months of age, puppies as young as two months of age may die due to massive migrations causing aortic aneurysms and/or pyothorax.6   Although cats are normally not thought to be susceptible, in fact vomiting has been reported as a consequence of S. Lupi infection in this species.7

Life cycle within the dog 
Once ingested, the L3 excyst in the stomach acid of the dog within hours and break through to the serosal surface within a day or two.  The L3 larvae take about a week to 10 days reach the thoracic aorta via the coeliac arteries.   Once in the aorta, they reside here for up to 3 months, maturing to the L4 stage, before migrating over the next few months to the caudal thoracic aorta.  They migrate in the wall of the aorta, causing it potentially serious scarring and damage.   This migration can result in sudden and catastrophic aortic rupture / aneurysm (possibly with higher infective doses), or be asymptomatic.  These pathognomonic features are the most consistent signs of spirocercosis.

(life cycle image)

Having undergone their final moult, once the L5 (adult) worms reach the oesophageal submucosa they mature, breed and the females lay microscopic eggs.  Males and females are distinguishable by 2 months post infection, but the oesophageal nodules take 3 to 9 months to develop.   The female creates an opening in the mucosa, but then moves back into the submucosa or muscularis to complete development.   Up to 2,000 eggs/gram faeces/day are passed out into the interior of the oesophagus and into faeces via the small opening which looks like a reddened nipple on endoscopy.   Generally, about 2000 eggs/gram of faeces are passed, with the peak egg-laying period being about 5 and 7 months post-infection.   The adult worms can remain viable for up to 2 years in the nodule.

The presence of the worm causes severe irritation to the oesophagus and it responds by laying down fibrous scar tissue and inflammatory tissue – a type of “pre-fibroma”. Although not a tumour, a suppurative prefibroma, or multiple fibromata, can be quite bulky – even larger than a grapefruit in some patients – and cause many problems.  Patients typically having 1 – 4 granulomata, each with 6 – 30 worms. Initially the nodule tissue is actually more akin to an abscess/fibroma tissue with fibrin, fluid, loose connective tissue and necrosis; as it transforms into a malignant nodule, giant cells increase and activation of inflammatory cells becomes more prominent.8

Spondylitis, a typical sign ascribed to spirocercosis, is thought to arise from aberrant migration of some of the larvae leaving the aorta.  Spondylitis is highly specific for spirocercosis.  It has even observed that the intraspinal migration of worms can cause a typical “acute intervertebral disc” syndrome.9-11  It has been described that some dogs develop salivary gland necrosis as a result of presumptive vagal afferent dysfunction12-14 (similar to the pathogenesis of hypertrophic osteopathy)4, 5, 13. They may also develop pyothorax, and S. lupi should be considered a potential cause for this syndrome.

Treatment 
Licensed treatments for Spirocercosis include:
 Advocate (Bayer; Imidocloprid + Moxidectin) - once weekly for 6 – 12 weeks
 Milbemax (Novartis; Milbemycin Oxime + Praziquantel) - once weekly for 4 – 12 weeks
Unlicensed treatments include the use of weekly doramectin or ivermectin injections.

Efficacy of treatment should be confirmed by radiography and/or follow-up endoscopy.

Sialoadenitis responds to treatment with phenobarbitone.

Patients with permanent megaoesophagus may required lifestyle alterations

Large nodules can be excised surgically although this is complex surgery requiring a specialist team.

Patients with neoplastic transformation of the tumours require chemotherapy; doxorubicin is thought to be the most effective drug for this, although no large trials exist to confirm this.

Patients with hypertrophic osteopathy (Marie's Disease) may respond to surgical removal of the chest mass or vagotomy.

Patients in endemic areas should also be tested for co-infection with Dirofilaria repens, as inadvertent treatment of this generally innocuous disease can cause dramatic and sometimes fatal consequences. Use of a macrocyclic lactone "net" strategy may reduce this risk.

Some clinical consequence of Spirocercosis 
In the earliest stages of infection, dogs may present with acute vomition, or have no symptoms whatsoever.   Later on, with nodule formation, one obvious problem is in swallowing.  Sometimes, dogs will vomit, retch or regurgitate. Other times, it may be more subtle. Dogs may just be inappetent; lick their lips; cry when swallowing; “cough” or “retch”; extend the neck; salivate; have diarrhoea; salivation; or submandibular lymphadenomegaly.   Some dogs just lose weight but continue eating. Other patients may appear to present with polyarthritis (immune-mediated); vague, sometimes severe generalised or localised pain (even over the lumbar region).

Apart from the manifestations and consequences mentioned, the worm can also:
 Some dogs develop a progressive widening and weakening of the aorta15-17 which can burst, particularly when particular sedatives are given;18
 Thrombosis (clot formation) with blockage of arteries has been reported.  To date, only one dog has survived this;19
 Obstruct the oesophagus
 Causing weight loss;
 Aspiration pneumonia; this is serious and can kill;
 Cause food and bacterial leakage into the chest, with a purulent and usually fatal pyothorax;
 Megaoesophagus;
 Trigger the immune system
 Causing muscle, joint, spinal or skin hyperaesthesias which seem to defy logic; in SA we also see occasional cases of IMHA, IMTP or IMPA20
 Fibromata can transform into cancers
 Usually malignant osteosarcomas, which can spread to other organs, especially the lungs and regional lymph nodes; the change from nodule to tumour is proposed to occur in two stages: initially it is inflammatory (characterized by fibrocytes and abundant collagen), then there is a pre-neoplastic stage (characterized by activated fibroblasts and reduced collagen) before full neoplastic change occurs.8 The same group found that the inflammation was characterized by pockets of pus surrounded by organized lymphoid foci. There was no evidence of local accumulation of FoxP3+ cells, unlike many previous studies that reported elevated numbers of this T cell subset in both malignancies and parasite infections.21
 This process seems to be driven by excessive PDGF, FGF and VEGF production22, and increased IL-8 levels (consistent with neutrophilic infiltration) and decreased IL-18 (possibly suppressed by the worms, permitting evasion of host responses) have been described in the serum of affected patients.23
 There are also cases of transabdominal migration causing abscessation in the region around the stomach. These are major surgical and medical challenges; one patient went on to develop diabetes mellitus as a consequence of the massive peripancreatic inflammation the spirocerca had caused.

Diagnosis 
Firstly, the veterinarian must suspect Spirocercosis.  Given its propensity for bizarre manifestations, this can sometimes be extremely challenging.   Nonetheless, it can be diagnosed in most cases by a combination of careful questioning, thoracic radiographs, fibre-scope (endoscopic) evaluation of the oesophagus and stomach and special faecal flotation techniques (the standard technique is not usually adequate).   In certain circumstances, CT scans of the chest; or exploratory surgery may be used for individual patients.  Sometimes, the diagnosis is just a surprise.  Standard faecal flotation techniques are inaccurate as egg laying is sporadic and affected by many factors, but modified sugar solution techniques and repeated floats (2 – 3 consecutive days) available from your veterinary laboratory can be 80% sensitive5. Eosinophilia is uncommon.

Faecal evaluation is readily available and in some hands, especially those using the sugar flotation technique of Markovics24, (as opposed to standard Zinc-Flotation techniques), diagnostic accuracy is very high (80% sensitivity). Most practices do not have this sugar solution or understand the technique and thus faecal flotation is not very sensitive. The Spirocerca eggs are light and small, and easily missed.

Radiography and CT (Computed tomography) are useful tools in the diagnosis of spirocercosis.  Radiographically, the mass may be visualised in the caudal oesophagus; undulation of the aortic outline; thoracic vertebral spondylitis[1] in ¼ of patients (over mid-thoracic region); air-filled oesophagus; and other distant signs (such as aspiration bronchopneumonia, pulmonary metastases, mediastinitis, hypertrophic osteopathy).  A pneumooesophagram or positive contrast oesophagram can be helpful in delineating the mass(es).17 An important factor is that the vet MUST take at least TWO orthogonal, thoracic views using a high kV (70 + 2 x cm thickness of chest) and low mAs (0.02) technique. Some authors have described the DV/VD evaluation of the aortic silhouette as the MOST accurate way of diagnosing spirocercosis on a radiograph, and spondylitis as an aid which increases sensitivity from 53% to 86%13. One third of patients have spondylitis. Do not confuse spondylitis with spondylosis. A right lateral radiograph is the preferred lateral view in South Africa, as the normal oesophagus cannot ordinarily be seen in this view.13, 15

Endoscopy is close to 100% sensitive for the detection of this disease13, although again, some masses can be extra-oesophageal or, with inadequate insufflation of the oesophagus, completely undetectable.   Patients undergoing anaesthesia for these procedures should not be premedicated with α2-agonists (medetomidine, xylazine) as this may raise aortic pressures and cause aneurismal rupture.18 It is important to us a methodical approach to gastro-oesophagoscopy; always start by advancing the scope to the stomach, retroflex the scope completely and check the inner cardiac sphincter for masses. Even a small 1 cm mass in this area can trigger profound vomition. Secondly, when doing oesophagoscopy, consider that you may not (a) have video-recording facilities and (b) you may need to rescope to assess response to treatment, particularly if this isn’t a good resolution of symptoms, and you may need to check for neoplastic transformation (evidence as ulceration and necrosis of the mass). In this instance, use a spirocerca mapping chart so that you can record “before” and “after” sizes, numbers, location and appearance of the mass. Write the distance to the lower oesophageal sphincter in the centre. T

If you are planning on performing surgery, or if there are questions about the aorta or neoplastic transformation, consider referring the patient to the university for a CT or CT angiogram. Knowing if the cardiac sphincter is involved is critical in making decisions about operability; and length of the involved oesophagus is also critical.
[1] Not spondylosis, which is a non-inflammatory, degenerative bridging osteogenic process between vertebrae; spondylitis occurs on the ventral body of the vertebra and is an inflammatory periostitis.

[1] A paratenic host carries the parasite mechanically but no biological change occurs during that carriage

Spirocerca lupi is a species of nematode. In dogs, infestation can cause sarcoma of the esophagus. Doramectin has been used against it.

References 

Spirurida